Mary Martha Good (born December 14, 1954) is an American politician who served in the Kansas House of Representatives from the 75th district from 2017 to 2019.

She was elected to an at-large seat on the Board of Trustees of Butler County College in November 2019.

References

1954 births
Living people
Republican Party members of the Kansas House of Representatives
Women state legislators in Kansas
21st-century American politicians
21st-century American women politicians